The German 86th Infantry Division was created on 26 August 1939. The division was disbanded on 3 November 1943.

Commanding officers
General der Infanterie Joachim Witthöft, 26 August 1939
General der Artillerie Helmuth Weidling, 1 January 1942

Order of battle
Infanterie-Regiment 167
Infanterie-Regiment 184
Infanterie-Regiment 216
Artillerie-Regiment 186
Divisionseinheiten 186

References 
Bibliography
 Tessin, Georg (1972). Verbände und Truppen der deutschen Wehrmacht und Waffen-SS im Zweiten Weltkrieg 1939–1945. Sechster Band. Die Landstreitkräfte 71–130. Osnabrück, Germany: Biblio-Verlag. .

0*086
Military units and formations established in 1939
1939 establishments in Germany
Military units and formations disestablished in 1943